Lucas Mariano Loccisano (born June 22, 1994), mostly known by his artistic name Locho or Locho Loccisano, is an Argentine singer, songwriter, guitarist, influencer and media personality.

Personal life 

Lucas Loccisano was born in Buenos Aires, Argentina on June 22, 1994. The nickname Locho was made by his sister and it was Lochi, but he decided to change it to Locho.

When he finished high school, he began studying law at the University of Buenos Aires but dropped out after two years to devote himself to music. At the age of 22 he started as a street artist singing and playing the guitar.

Career on TV 
He started his career on TV on the thirteenth edition of the youth program Combate, finished being runner-up.

On 2019 he has been on the TV program of Net TV being comedian on Tenemos Wifi.

From 2021 to February he has been on La ruleta de tus sueños, the TV show of Pamela David being the secretary.

On 2021 he participated on the Netflix reality show called: Jugando con fuego: Latino.

He has been on 2022 on the reality  show of eltrece, being on the first season of El hotel de los famosos, where he stood out among the other participants, based on, according to some social network users, he suffered bullying from some participants, on episode 78, he confessed that the unrelenting harassment has impacted him personally. That confession led to many of the reality show participants being canceled, with many of their posts crowded with hashtag #StopBullying, in solidarity with Locho's dilemma.

On July 8, 2022, he was convocated by Marcelo Tinelli to participate on Argentine version of the reality show All Together Now  for being jury. And he was confirmed on July 12 for being officially jury.

Filmography

TV Reality shows

TV programs

TV ceremonies
 2022 - FNM (Canal Cuatro - Jujuy)

Radio
 2020 - Te Lo Conté (Radio Cadena Uno)

Musical videos
  2021 - Después de las 22'' (by Melina De Piano - on YouTube)

Discography

Singles

Productions by herself
L'oro di chi by Marking

Awards

References

1994 births
Living people
Argentine singer-songwriters
Argentine guitarists
Argentine television personalities